"With You" is a single by popular English rock band The Subways, from their debut album Young for Eternity. It was released on the 12 September 2005.

Music video
The video for the single was shot on 7 July 2005 in London. It featured fans from the bands' online forum.

Track listings
7"
 "With You"
 "Staring At The Sun"
CDS
 "With You"
 "A Plain Above"
DVD
 "With You"
 "Lost You To The City"
 "Rock & Roll Queen" - Live From The Isle Of Wight [Video]
 "With You" [Video]
 "Making Of The Video" [Video]

Chart performance
The song peaked at number 29 on the UK singles chart.

2005 singles
The Subways songs
2005 songs